The Istanbul-class frigates are a planned group of four multirole frigates for the Turkish Naval Forces. Developed under the MILGEM national warship program as the I-class frigate, the Istanbul class is an enlarged version of the  anti-submarine corvette, with enhanced endurance and MDAS Vertical Launching System (VLS) for multi-role capability. On 19 January 2017, Turkish Navy held a ceremonial steel cut for the lead ship TCG Istanbul (F 515). Istanbul was laid down on 3 July 2017 and launched on 23 January 2021.

History and background

The Istanbul class has its origins in the Turkish MILGEM project for developing national warships and warship building industry. The program calls for the construction of a warship family in three classes, where all vessels would be designed with high degree of commonality. First product of the project emerged as Ada-class anti-submarine/patrol corvette. The Istanbul class, originally known as the TF-100 class under MILGEM-G designation, belongs to the second development phase, where structure of the Ada class vessel is extended to host multi-role capabilities.

The Istanbul class is an enlarged variant of the Ada class and will feature a slightly larger hull for improved endurance. In addition to retaining the guns, self protection and anti-submarine warfare systems of the Ada class, the Istanbul class will have twice the number of anti-ship missiles and will be equipped with the indigenous MDAS Vertical Launching System,   capable of firing HISAR and other missiles, along with other systems for improved multi-role combat capabilities. The experience and technological know-how gained with the Istanbul class will play an important role in determining the design characteristics and the development process of the TF-2000-class frigates, as well as the selection of the systems and equipment which will be used on these significantly larger and more capable warships.

The first ship and nameship of the class, TCG Istanbul, was laid down on 19 January 2017. The fifth and largest modern warship to be both indigenously designed and built in Turkey, it is claimed that at least 75% of its systems will be of indigenous manufacture. Its steel cutting ceremony was attended by Turkish Defence Minister Fikri Işık and senior military officers, including Admiral Bülent Bostanoğlu, Commander of the Turkish Naval Forces.

Construction is expected to take four years and the vessel will be commissioned into service sometime in 2021.

Export versions

Ukraine
In December 2020, Ukraine signed a contract for four corvettes. Industry sources say the builder, STM, may have to substitute some American-made parts in the MILGEM project architecture with locally made components due to a recent U.S. decision to sanction Turkey's procurement agency, the Presidency of Defense Industries.

Ships in the class

See also
 
 Type 054A frigate

References

Frigate classes
Proposed ships
Frigates of the Turkish Navy